Oeconesidae is a family of caddisflies in the order Trichoptera. There are about 6 genera and 19 described species in Oeconesidae, found mainly in New Zealand. A single species, Tascuna ignota, is found in Tasmania.

Genera
These six genera belong to the family Oeconesidae:
 Oeconesus McLachlan, 1862
 Pseudoeconesus McLachlan, 1894
 Tarapsyche McFarlane, 1960
 Tascuna Neboiss, 1975
 Zelandopsyche Tillyard, 1921
 Zepsyche McFarlane, 1960

References

Trichoptera
Trichoptera families